The Midwest or Midwestern United States is a region of the United States.

Mid West or Midwest may also refer to:

Airlines
 Air Midwest, based in the U.S. state of Kansas, subsidiary of Mesa, closed in 2008
 Midwest Airlines, based in the U.S. state of Wisconsin, merged into Frontier Airlines in 2011
 Midwest Airlines (Egypt)

Music
 Midwest (album), by Mathias Eick, 2015
 Midwesterners: The Hits, a greatest hits album by Hawthorne Heights

Places
 Mid West (Western Australia)
 Mid-Western Region, Nepal
 Mid-Western Region, Nigeria
 Mid-West Region, Ireland
 Midwest, Wyoming, a community in the U.S. state of Wyoming

Other uses
 Mid Western University, a public university located in Birendranagar, Surkhet, Nepal

See also
 Central West (disambiguation)